William Merrifield VC, MM (9 October 1890 – 8 August 1943) was an English-born Canadian recipient of the Victoria Cross (VC), the highest and most prestigious award for gallantry in the face of the enemy that can be awarded to British and Commonwealth forces. A soldier with Canadian Expeditionary Force during the First World War, he was awarded the VC for his actions on 1 October 1918, during the Battle of the Canal du Nord. Earlier in the war he had been awarded the Military Medal.

Early life
William Merrifield was born at Brentwood, Essex in England on 9 October 1890. He emigrated to Canada for employment, settling in Ottawa. He later moved to Sudbury, where he worked as a fireman on the Canadian Pacific Railway. He also joined the 97th Regiment, known as the Algonquin Rifles, a unit of Canada's militia.

First World War
On 23 September 1914, shortly after the outbreak of the First World War, Merrifield enlisted in the Canadian Expeditionary Force (CEF), being posted to the 2nd Battalion. He fought at the Second Battle of Ypres in 1915, and two years later was transferred to the CEF's 4th Battalion, part of the 1st Infantry Brigade, 1st Canadian Division. He participated in the Battle of Passchendaele, and for his conduct during the fighting was awarded the Military Medal (MM).

On 1 October 1918, along with the rest of the 1st Division, the 4th Battalion was engaged in the Battle of the Canal du Nord, advancing near Abancourt, north of Cambrai. However, the flanking British division had failed to progress its own front, and the Canadians were exposed to machine-gun fire. Merrifield, now a sergeant and leading a platoon, made a solo foray to deal with two machine-gun posts. Despite being wounded, he was successful in his endeavours and resumed the advance with his platoon. It was not until he was again wounded that he was treated for his wounds. He was awarded the Victoria Cross (VC) for his actions. The VC, instituted in 1856, was the highest award for valour that could be bestowed on a soldier of the British Empire. The citation for his VC read as follows:

King George V presented Merrifield with a VC on 26 January 1919, in a ceremony at York Cottage in Sandringham. He returned to Canada a few months later and was discharged from the CEF.

Later life

Resuming to civilian life, Merrifield remained in the militia, in which he was now a lieutenant. In late 1919, he accompanied the then Prince Edward for part of his royal tour of Canada. Two years later, Merrifield married Maude  and the couple lived in Sault Ste. Marie, in Ontario. In 1939, he suffered a stroke. His health never recovered and he died in a hospital in Toronto on 8 August 1943. He is buried in West Korah Cemetery in Sault Ste. Marie.

A school in Sault Ste. Marie was named after him in recognition of his service to his country although it was closed in 2015. The armoury of the 56th Field Artillery Regiment in Brantford, Ontario, is also named for Merrifield.

Victoria Cross
In addition to the VC and MM, Merrifield was also entitled to the 1914–15 Star, the British War Medal, and the Victory Medal. He also held the King George VI Coronation Medal. His medals were donated to the Canadian War Museum by the Merrifield family in November 2005.

Notes

References

External links 
 William Merrifield's digitized service file
 Short biography of William Merrifield on DND's Directorate of History and Heritage

Canadian World War I recipients of the Victoria Cross
1890s births
1943 deaths
Canadian recipients of the Military Medal
Royal Hamilton Light Infantry (Wentworth Regiment)
English emigrants to Canada
People from Brentwood, Essex
Canadian Expeditionary Force soldiers
Military personnel from Essex
Canadian military personnel of World War I
Burials in Ontario
Canadian Militia officers